Something's Gotta Give is the fifth full-length studio album by New York hardcore band Agnostic Front. It was released in June 1998 on Epitaph Records and follows 1995's Raw Unleashed compilation album. It is actually the first studio album since 1992's One Voice. The album was co-produced by Billy Milano, the frontman of crossover thrash bands S.O.D. and M.O.D.

The album marks a return to a more hardcore punk style of sound, rather than the thrash metal inspired music of One Voice. Backing vocals, amongst others, were provided by Tim Armstrong and Lars Frederiksen of Rancid, and Jimmy Gestapo of Murphy's Law. Another album swiftly followed in 1999, Riot, Riot, Upstart. 

The track "Gotta Go" appeared on a volume of Epitaph Records' Punk-o-Rama compilation series. The song "Pauly the Dog" is a variation of Johnny Cash's "Dirty Old Egg-Sucking Dog".

Track listing

Personnel
Agnostic Front
 Roger Miret – vocals
 Vinnie Stigma – guitars
 Rob Kabula – bass
 Jim Colletti – drums

Other musicians
Brad Logan – additional guitars, backing vocals

Production
Recorded at Explosive Sound Design in Hoboken, New Jersey
Produced by Billy Milano and Roger Miret
Engineered by Billy Milano

External links
Epitaph Records album page

1998 albums
Agnostic Front albums